Result is a populated place in Greene County, New York,  United States. Greene County has a population of 49,221.

History
A post office called Result was established in 1890, and remained in operation until it was discontinued in 1908. Result has been noted for its unusual place name.

References

Hamlets in Greene County, New York